Pituophis is a genus of nonvenomous colubrid snakes,  commonly referred to as gopher snakes, pine snakes, and bullsnakes, which are endemic to North America.

Geographic range
Species and subspecies within the genus Pituophis are found throughout Mexico, the Southern and Western United States and Western Canada.

Description
All species of Pituophis are large and powerfully built. The head is relatively small in proportion to the body and it is only slightly distinct from the neck. The rostral is enlarged and elongated, imparting a characteristic somewhat pointed shape to the head. All the species occurring in the United States have four prefrontals instead of the usual two.

Modified epiglottis
In all snakes of the genus Pituophis, the epiglottis is peculiarly modified so that it is thin, erect and flexible. When a stream of air is forced from the trachea, the epiglottis vibrates, thereby producing the peculiarly loud, hoarse hissing for which bullsnakes, gopher snakes and pine snakes are well known.

Species and subspecies

References

Further reading

External links

Accounts of four subspecies, P. deppei deppei, P. deppei jani, P. lineaticollis lineaticollis and P. lineaticollis gibsoni, are given in Duellman WE (1960). "A Taxonomic Study of the Middle American Snake, Pituophis deppei". University of Kansas Publications, Museum of Natural History 10: 599–610.

 
Colubrids
Snake genera
Snakes of North America
Taxa named by John Edwards Holbrook